is a railway station in the city of Katagami, Akita, Japan, operated by JR East.

Lines

Station layout
The station consists of one side platform serving a single electrified bi-directional track. The station is unattended.

History
With the privatization of JNR on April 1, 1987, the station has been managed by JR East. A new station building was completed in February 2006.

Surrounding area
Detohama Beach

External links

 JR East Station information 

Railway stations in Japan opened in 1951
Railway stations in Akita Prefecture
Oga Line
Katagami, Akita